Thum is a city in Saxony. Thum may also refer to:

Thum, alternative name of Kreuzau in North Rhine-Westphalia
Thum (title), Pakistan
Thum (surname)
Thüm., taxonomic author abbreviation of Felix von Thümen (1839–1892), German botanist and mycologist